Alvaradoa amorphoides, the Mexican alvaradoa, is a species of plant in the Picramniaceae family. It is a common native plant in Mexico but is also native to southern Florida, where is it endangered.

References

External links
 Natives for your Neighbourhood - The Institute for Regional Conservation, Miami - Mexican alvaradoa
 John C. Gifford Arboretum, University of Miami - Alvaradoa

Picramniales
Flora of Mexico
Trees of the United States